My Leopold (German:Mein Leopold) is a 1914 German silent comedy film directed by Heinrich Bolten-Baeckers and starring Felix Basch, Lotte Erol and Richard Georg. It was the first of three silent film adaptations Bolten-Baeckers made of the 1873 play of the same name by Adolphe L'Arronge.

Cast
In alphabetical order
 Felix Basch 
 Lotte Erol 
 Richard Georg 
 Erich Kämmerer 
 Paula Levermann 
 Leo Peukert

References

Bibliography
 Kay Weniger. 'Es wird im Leben dir mehr genommen als gegeben ...' Lexikon der aus Deutschland und ™sterreich emigrierten Filmschaffenden 1933 bis 1945: Eine Gesamt bersicht. ACABUS Verlag, 2011.

External links

1914 films
Films of the German Empire
Films directed by Heinrich Bolten-Baeckers
German silent feature films
German black-and-white films
1914 comedy films
German films based on plays
German comedy films
Silent comedy films
1910s German films
1910s German-language films